Peter Wilson (10 March 1907 – 2 June 1986) was a New Zealand cricketer. He played in three first-class matches for Wellington in 1940/41.

See also
 List of Wellington representative cricketers

References

External links
 

1907 births
1986 deaths
New Zealand cricketers
Wellington cricketers
Cricketers from Wellington City